Dr. Mario: Miracle Cure is a puzzle video game for the Nintendo 3DS. It was released in Japan on May 31, 2015 and North America, Europe, and Australia on June 11, 2015.

Gameplay

Dr. Mario: Miracle Cure is a falling block tile-matching video game. Its five game modes each have optional power-ups. The first mode, "Dr. Mario", has the traditional rules of the Dr. Mario series. In "Dr. Luigi", two different capsules joined into L-shaped configurations are dropped into the playing field (as in the "Operation L" mode of Dr. Luigi (2013) for Wii U). These modes have single player and competitive multiplayer modes. "Virus Buster", a game mode in Dr. Mario Online Rx and Dr. Luigi, is played by holding the Nintendo 3DS vertically and using the touchscreen to drag the capsules. The online mode utilizes the Nintendo Network service. Finally, the debuting "Miracle Cure Laboratory" mode features several set challenges. Unlike previous entries in the series, the soundtrack is not selectable, and has random songs from Dr. Mario Online Rx and Dr. Luigi.

Reception

The game is scored 69/100 on Metacritic.

Jason Venter of GameSpot rated the game seven out of ten. He praised the power-ups new to the series and the subsequent new puzzles, but said that the game needed more than 50 puzzles. He appreciated the return of the Dr. Luigi and Virus Buster gameplay modes.

Notes

References

External links
 

2015 video games
Dr. Mario games
Multiplayer and single-player video games
Nintendo Network games
Nintendo 3DS eShop games
Nintendo 3DS-only games
Nintendo 3DS games
Video games developed in Japan
Arika games